Départ is an album by British jazz trio Azimuth, whose members were vocalist Norma Winstone, pianist John Taylor, and trumpeter Kenny Wheeler. It was recorded in December 1979 at Talent Studios in Oslo, and was released in 1980 by ECM. On the album, the group is joined by guitarist Ralph Towner.

Reception

The authors of the Penguin Guide to Jazz Recordings called Towner "an ideal guest," and wrote: "Much as he does on Weather Report's I Sing the Body Electric, Towner sounds as if he comes from outside the basic conception of the group, but with a genuine understanding and appreciation of what it's all about. His contribution is perhaps most emphatic on 'Arrivée'... linking the whole disc into a continuous suite."

Writing for Between Sound and Space, Tyran Grillo described the album as "Azimuth's most fully realized effort, through which the project honed its sound to an art," and noted: "Winstone's overdubs visualize gossamer veils of more distant storms, while Wheeler's soulful trumpet shines like the sun beyond them... The brief addition of Tower heightens their collective sound, even as it tethers them to the earth."

Track listing
All compositions by John Taylor.

 "The Longest Day" – 6:32
 "Autumn" – 11:10
 "Arrivée" – 7:52
 "Touching Points: a. From the Window" – 1:14
 "Touching Points: b. Windfall" – 4:37
 "Touching Points: c. The Rabbit" – 2:36
 "Touching Points: d. Charcoal Traces" – 4:37
 "Départ" – 10:29
 "The Longest Day (reprise)" – 3:44

Personnel
Azimuth
Norma Winstone – vocals
John Taylor – piano, organ
Kenny Wheeler – trumpet, flugelhorn
Ralph Towner – 12-string guitar, classical guitar

References

ECM Records albums
Azimuth (band) albums
1980 albums
Albums produced by Manfred Eicher